Gary Sciacca (born March 10, 1960, in Brooklyn, New York) is an American  horse trainer in the sport of Thoroughbred horse racing.

Sciacca earned his first win as a professional trainer on October 21, 1981, at New York's Aqueduct Racetrack. In 1992 he conditioned Saratoga Dew to American Champion Three-Year-Old Filly honors, the first New York-bred horse to win an Eclipse Award.

On November 18, 2008, Sciacca began serving a 120-day suspension order issued by the New York State Racing and Wagering Board.  for  Under the Trainers Responsibility Rule, the Board found him accountable for a milkshaking incident at his stable which occurred while he was on vacation. 
On August 18th ,2022 ,at Saratoga Raceway, a group of rowdy horse racing lovers from downstate NY were caught rolling the trainers favorite golf cart around the grounds. Upon discovering this , Sciacca immediately went into a curse laden  rage in front of women and children. 20 minutes later that group won big off his horse, “Sell Something”.

References
 1992 New York Times article on Gary Sciacca and Saratoga Dew
 Gary Sciacca at the NTRA

1960 births
Living people
American horse trainers
People from Brooklyn